SP7 may refer to :
 Sp7 transcription factor, a human gene
 2771 Polzunov (1978 SP7), a Main-belt Asteroid discovered on September 26, 1978
 S.A.R.A. SP7, a chassis of a racing car used at the 1928 24 Hours of Le Mans